Yauri Airport  is an extremely high elevation airport serving the town of Espinar in the Cusco Region of Peru.

See also

Transport in Peru
List of airports in Peru

References

External links
OpenStreetMap - Yauri
OurAirports - Yauri
SkyVector - Yauri
Yauri Airport

Airports in Peru
Buildings and structures in Cusco Region